Leslee Feldman is the Head of Casting at Amblin Partners and is the former Head of Casting at DreamWorks, the studio which produced such films as Shrek, The Prince of Egypt, Road to Perdition, Old School, and Anchorman: The Legend of Ron Burgundy, among others. Feldman's old DreamWorks position is currently held by her former colleague Christi Soper Hilt. This change came soon after NBCUniversal acquired DreamWorks in 2016. 

She was Casting Director for the following movies:
The Turning (2020)
Trolls Holiday (2017)
Captain Underpants: The First Epic Movie (2017)
The Boss Baby (2017)
Trolls (2016)
Kung Fu Panda 3 (2016)
Home (2015)
Penguins of Madagascar (2014)
How to Train Your Dragon 2 (2014)
Mr. Peabody & Sherman (2014)
Turbo (2013)
Letters to Jackie: Remembering President Kennedy (Documentary) (2013)
The Croods (2013)
Rise of the Guardians (2012)
Madagascar 3: Europe's Most Wanted (2012)
Puss in Boots (2011)
Kung Fu Panda 2 (2011)
Kung Fu Panda Holiday (2010)
Megamind (2010)
Shrek Forever After (2010)
How to Train Your Dragon (2010)
Merry Madagascar (2009)
Monsters vs. Aliens: Mutant Pumpkins from Outer Space (2009)
Monsters vs. Aliens (2009)
Madagascar: Escape 2 Africa (2008)
Kung Fu Panda (2008)
Shrek the Halls (2007)
Bee Movie (2007)
Shrek the Third (2007)
Flushed Away (2006)
Over the Hedge (2006)
Madagascar (2005)
Anchorman: The Legend of Ron Burgundy (2004)
Shark Tale (2004)
Shrek 2 (2004)
Sinbad: Legend of the Seven Seas (2003)
Old School (2003)
Road to Perdition (2002)
Spirit: Stallion of the Cimarron (2002)
Shrek (2001)
Joseph: King of Dreams (2000)
The Road to El Dorado (2000)
The Prince of Egypt (1998)
Antz (1998)

Link

Year of birth missing (living people)
Living people
American casting directors
Women casting directors
Place of birth missing (living people)
DreamWorks Animation people